Lingeigh is an uninhabited island off North Uist, south east of Boreray. It is separated from North Uist by Traigh Lingeigh.

Footnotes

Uist islands
Uninhabited islands of the Outer Hebrides